Hai Lam (born 11 January 1983) is a Norwegian former professional footballer who last played for Ham-Kam.

He was born in Hamar, joined the senior team of Hamarkameratene from the club's own junior ranks in 2001, and made his league debut on 12 June 2001 against FK Oslo Øst. He later played with Hamarkameratene in the Norwegian Premier League. Ahead of the 2007 season he joined Nybergsund IL. He rejoined Hamarkameratene ahead of the 2010 season.

He is of Vietnamese descent.

References

1983 births
Living people
Norwegian footballers
Hamarkameratene players
Nybergsund IL players
Sportspeople from Hamar
Norwegian people of Vietnamese descent
Sportspeople of Vietnamese descent
Eliteserien players
Association football defenders